Romilly may refer to:

People
Romilly (surname)
Baron Romilly, title created in 1866
Romilly Jenkins, British historian and scholar
Romilly Lunge, British actor
Romilly Weeks, British newsreader

Places
in France:
 Romilly, Loir-et-Cher, in the Loir-et-Cher department
 Romilly-la-Puthenaye, in the Eure department
 Romilly-sur-Aigre, in the Eure-et-Loir department
 Romilly-sur-Andelle, in the Eure department
 Romilly-sur-Seine, in the Aube department
Romilly, Vale of Glamorgan, a district of Barry, Vale of Glamorgan, Wales